Milbourne Lodge School is a co-educational pre-prep and preparatory school for children aged four to thirteen.

History
Milbourne Lodge was founded in 1912 by Harvey Wyatt, who established the school in Arbrook Lane, Surrey. The school is situated on its original site, with the preparatory year groups occupying the original school building and the pre-preparatory year groups taught in what was previously the Headmaster's house.

In 1948 the school was bought by Norman Hale who was Headmaster for fifty-one years.

Pupils at Milbourne Lodge subsequently win scholarships and places at major independent schools, such as Eton College, Harrow School, Winchester College, Charterhouse, Wellington College, St Paul's School, The Royal Grammar School and Wycombe Abbey.  Over the past twenty-five years, pupils have won more than one hundred academic scholarships to Eton, St. Paul's and Winchester.

In 2007 Milbourne Lodge became part of the Cognita group. The present head is Judy Waite.

References

External links 
 
 

Preparatory schools in Surrey
Cognita
Educational institutions established in 1912
1912 establishments in England
Borough of Elmbridge